Vagner Edvard Holger Engberg (4 January 1909 – 28 February 1993) was a Swedish ice hockey player. He competed in the men's tournament at the 1936 Winter Olympics.

References

External links
 

1909 births
1993 deaths
Ice hockey players at the 1936 Winter Olympics
Olympic ice hockey players of Sweden
Ice hockey people from Stockholm